Christian Gómez (born 7 November 1974) is an Argentine former professional footballer.

Career

Argentina 
Gómez began playing professional soccer at the age of 17 with Argentine club Nueva Chicago, which was at the time playing in the second division. He played with the team from 1991 to 1997, appearing in 155 games and scoring 46 goals.  In 1997, Gómez moved to one of Argentina's largest and most successful clubs, CA Independiente, which he would play for from 1997 to 1999, scoring 12 goals in 80 games. He moved to Argentinos Juniors, where he would finish out the second half of 1999–2000 season.  Gómez then returned to Nueva Chicago, where he would help the team earn promotion to the first division, while scoring 14 goals in 63 games.  He then briefly returned to Independiente in 2002, before moving to Arsenal de Sarandí, where he would play in 30 games, scoring 6 goals, between 2003 and 2004.

United States 
Gómez signed with D.C. United of MLS on 14 August 2004 who had been interested in him for several years, and he played his first match for the club on 21 August 2004. Gómez played nine regular season games for United, catalyzing the offense while teaming very well with Jaime Moreno, and finished the season with four goals. He then helped them to the MLS Cup. In 2005, Gómez scored 11 goals and 9 assists and was named to the MLS Best XI. In 2006 Gómez won the MLS MVP award. In the 2007 MLS season, Gomez played in 27 games (27 starts) and compiled 10 goals and 9 assists. Gomez was named MLS All-Star in 2005, 2006 and 2007.

He was traded to the Colorado Rapids for the 2008 season in exchange of a Designated Player sport and a first round pick in the 2009 MLS SuperDraft. However, his season with the Rapids was disappointing.

He was traded back to D.C. United for the 2009 season.
After playing with United in 2009, it was reported on 1 February 2010, that Gomez would not return to United for the 2010 season. He subsequently signed with USSF Division 2 club Miami FC on 25 March 2010.

Honors

D.C. United 
Major League Soccer MLS Cup: 2004
Major League Soccer Supporter's Shield: 2006, 2007

Individual 
Major League Soccer MVP: 2006
MLS Best XI: 2005, 2006, 2007

References

External links 

 

1974 births
Living people
Argentine footballers
Club Atlético Independiente footballers
Argentinos Juniors footballers
Arsenal de Sarandí footballers
Nueva Chicago footballers
D.C. United players
Footballers from Buenos Aires
Argentine expatriate footballers
Colorado Rapids players
Miami FC (2006) players
Major League Soccer players
Major League Soccer All-Stars
Argentine expatriate sportspeople in the United States
Expatriate soccer players in the United States
Argentine Primera División players
USSF Division 2 Professional League players
Association football midfielders